Man and Woman is a 1920 American silent drama film produced by A. H. Fischer, Inc. Directors were Charles Logue and B. A. Rolfe with Gene O'Donnell and Conrad Wells (as A. Fried) as cinematographers. Logue wrote the story and the screenplay.

Plot
A young Civil engineer builds a bridge that later collapses which causes him to mentally collapse. He retreats to a South Pacific Ocean island and becomes a beachcomber. Later one of his former engineering supervisors comes to the island with his daughter to repair a lighthouse. She bets the local Governor that she can dress up a beach bum to pass as a society swell. She picks the young former engineer. He decides to teach her a lesson and takes her to a leprosy colony where she is "treated like dirt". She learns her lesson and her father gives him a job at the lighthouse.

Cast
 Diana Allen as Diana Murdock
 Joe King as Joe
 Eddie Sturgis as The Flash
 John L. Shine as Greasy
 Tatjana Irrah as The Duchess
 Eleanor Cozzat as The Waif
 G. H. Carlyle as The Beast
 A. C. Milar as Murdock
 Gordon Standing as Bradley 
 James Alling as Bishop Graham
 Herbert Standing as Governor-General
 Pat Jennings as The First Mate
 Dorothea Fischer as Perkins
 Pat Fischer as Perkins
 Harry F. Millarde

References
Man and Woman at Southseascinema.org

External links

 

1920 films
American silent feature films
1920s English-language films
1920 drama films
Silent American drama films
American black-and-white films
Films directed by B. A. Rolfe
Films directed by Charles A. Logue
1920s American films
English-language drama films